

183001–183100 

|-bgcolor=#f2f2f2
| colspan=4 align=center | 
|}

183101–183200 

|-id=114
| 183114 Vicques ||  || The Swiss municipality of Vicques, in the Jura Mountains, where this asteroid was discovered at the Jura Observatory || 
|-id=182
| 183182 Weinheim ||  || The German town of Weinheim, located on the western side of the Odenwald mountain range near Heidelberg Germany || 
|}

183201–183300 

|-id=287
| 183287 Deisenstein ||  || Daniel Eisenstein (born 1970), an American astronomer with the Sloan Digital Sky Survey || 
|-id=288
| 183288 Eyer ||  || Laurent Eyer (born 1965), a Swiss astronomer with the Sloan Digital Sky Survey || 
|-id=294
| 183294 Langbroek ||  || Marco Langbroek (born 1970), Dutch archeologist and amateur astronomer, who also observes meteors as a member of the Dutch Meteor Society || 
|}

183301–183400 

|-id=357
| 183357 Rickshelton ||  || Richard G. Shelton (born 1957), Johns Hopkins University Applied Physics Laboratory, served as a Senior Mission Operations Analyst for the New Horizons mission to Pluto. || 
|}

183401–183500 

|-id=403
| 183403 Gal ||  || Roy Gal (born 1973), an American astronomer with the Sloan Digital Sky Survey || 
|}

183501–183600 

|-id=560
| 183560 Křišťan ||  || Christian of Prachatice (1360–1368), medieval Czech astronomer || 
|}

183601–183700 

|-id=635
| 183635 Helmi ||  || Amina Helmi (born 1970), an Argentinian-Dutch astronomer with the Sloan Digital Sky Survey || 
|}

183701–183800 

|-bgcolor=#f2f2f2
| colspan=4 align=center | 
|}

183801–183900 

|-bgcolor=#f2f2f2
| colspan=4 align=center | 
|}

183901–184000 

|-bgcolor=#f2f2f2
| colspan=4 align=center | 
|}

References 

183001-184000